Valea Mare is a commune in Olt County, Muntenia, Romania. It is composed of five villages: Bârca, Recea, Turia, Valea Mare and Zorleasca.

References

Communes in Olt County
Localities in Muntenia